"The Cover of 'Rolling Stone'" is a song written by Shel Silverstein and first recorded by American rock group Dr. Hook & the Medicine Show. Produced by Ron Haffkine and released in 1972, it was the band's third single and peaked at No. 6 on the U.S. pop chart for two weeks on March 17–24, 1973. The song satirically laments that the band had not appeared on the cover of the Rolling Stone, a magazine that focuses on music, politics, and popular culture. The song's success led to the band appearing on the cover of Rolling Stone in 1973, albeit in caricature.

History and description

The song satirizes success in the music business; the  narrator laments that his band, despite having the superficial attributes of successful rock stars (including drug usage, "teenage groupies, who'll do anything we say," and a frenetic guitar solo) has been unable to "get our picture/on the cover of the Rolling Stone."

As the song was riding high on the charts, the magazine finally acquiesced to Dr. Hook's request — after a fashion: the March 29, 1973, cover of Rolling Stone did indeed feature the band, but in caricature form rather than a photograph (and with only three of the band's seven members). Also, the group's name was not used; instead the caption read simply, "What's-Their-Names Make the Cover".

BBC Radio refused to play the song, as it contained the name of a commercial publication (Rolling Stone) and could therefore be considered advertising. An urban legend states that the song was re-recorded by the band as "The Cover of the Radio Times", the weekly television and radio guide published by the BBC; however, this is disputed by Dennis Locorriere, Dr. Hook's co-lead singer. "Legend has it that we went into a studio and re-recorded the song. What actually happened was that a bunch of BBC disc jockeys went into a studio and shouted 'RADIO TIMES' over our original chorus," Locorriere said. "It's the same recording that we released but with the addition of their voices layered on top of ours. You can, however, still hear us singing 'Rolling Stone,' but way in the background, under their voices." The new version was rush-released in the UK, but did not find its way onto the charts there. However the band's UK publicists took advantage of the BBC's uptight attitude by advertising the single in the UK music press as "the first banned single of 1973".

Chart performance

Weekly charts

Year-end charts

Cover versions
The song has been covered by various artists, including R. Stevie Moore on his 1987 album Teenage Spectacular; Poison on their 2000 album Crack a Smile... and More!; Sammy Kershaw on his 2010 album Better Than I Used to Be, with his version featuring Jamey Johnson; Black Francis on the album Twistable, Turnable Man: A Musical Tribute to the Songs of Shel Silverstein in 2010, and Jackyl on their 2012 studio album Best in Show. Canadian singer Corb Lund featured the song on his 2019 EP Cover Your Tracks in a duet with Hayes Carll.

Buck Owens and the Buckaroos parodied the song as "On the Cover of the Music City News" on the 1974 album It's A Monster's Holiday and the 1976 album Best of Buck Owens, Volume 6.

German comedian Mike Krüger covered and translated the song with small lyrical changes for his 1978 album Stau mal wieder, changing the title to "Auf der Hülle mit den Rolling Stones" (On the Cover with the Rolling Stones), lyrics implying he would like to have his photograph as an album cover for the Rolling Stones.

In 1987 Dutch band Bertus Staigerpaip released a parody: "De veurplaat van d'n Donald Duck" (the cover of the Donald Duck Weekblad - a Dutch comic magazine).

Phish covered the song at the Great Western Forum in Inglewood, California on 2/14/03 The performance foreshadowed their actual appearance on the cover of Rolling Stone’s March 3, 2003 issue.

In popular culture
The song was featured in the 2000 film Almost Famous, sung by the characters in the film.

See also

 Country rock
 Lists of people on the United States cover of Rolling Stone

References

External links
 Lyrics of this song at Lyrics.com
 

Songs about musicians
1972 singles
1973 singles
Dr. Hook & the Medicine Show songs
Novelty songs
Song recordings produced by Ron Haffkine
Songs written by Shel Silverstein
Rolling Stone
1972 songs
Columbia Records singles
Songs banned by the BBC